The Macclesfield Football Club is an Australian rules football club first formed in 1880.

In 1923, Macclesfield was a founding member of the Hills Central Football Association, playing in that competition until the end of the 1966 season.  As a result of the restructure of Hills football in 1967, Macclesfield joined the Hills Football League Southern Zone, shifting to Division 4 in 1972, Division 3 in 1974 and then Division 2 in 1979.  In 1984, Macclesfield joined the Southern Football League Division 2 competition, but only lasted 5 seasons, before shifting back to the Hills Football League Division 2 competition in 1989.

Macclesfield continue to field Senior and Junior teams in the Hills Football League Division 2 competition.

A-Grade Premierships
 1929 Hills Central Football Association A1  
 1948 Hills Central Football Association A1  
 1958 Hills Central Football Association A2
 1959 Hills Central Football Association A2
 1969 Hills Football League Southern Zone  
 1972 Hills Football League Division 4 
 1973 Hills Football League Division 4 
 1980 Hills Football League Division 2

References

Australian rules football clubs in South Australia
1880 establishments in Australia
Australian rules football clubs established in 1880